Pic Bayle is a summit in the Dauphiné Alps, culminating at a height of , the highest point of the Massif des Grandes Rousses. It is above the resort of Alpe D'Huez.

References 

Mountains of the Alps
Mountains of Isère
Alpine three-thousanders